The 1952 Davidson Wildcats football team was an American football team that represented Davidson College during the 1952 college football season as a member of the Southern Conference. In their first year under head coach Bill Dole, the team compiled an overall record of 2–7, with a mark of 1–6 in conference play, and finished in 14th place in the SoCon.

Schedule

References

Davidson
Davidson Wildcats football seasons
Davidson Wildcats football